The Torres government is the incumbent regional government of the Canary Islands led by President Ángel Víctor Torres. It was formed in July 2019 after the regional election.

Investiture

Government

References

2019 establishments in the Canary Islands
Cabinets established in 2019
Cabinets of the Canary Islands